Magdeleine Vallieres Mill (born 10 August 2001) is a Canadian professional racing cyclist, who currently rides for UCI Women's Continental Team . She rode in the women's road race event at the 2020 UCI Road World Championships.
At the 2019 Global Relay Canadian Road Championships, she won the junior women road race and junior women time trial. She represented Canada in the junior women road race and in the junior women time trial at the 2019 UCI Road World Championships.

Major results
2018
 National Junior Road Championships
3rd Time Trial
2019
 National Junior Road Championships
1st  Time Trial
1st  Road Race
 UCI Junior Road World Championships
10th Road race
 6th White Spot / Delta Road Race
2021
 7th Overall Watersley Womens Challenge

References

External links
 

2001 births
Living people
Canadian female cyclists
Sportspeople from Sherbrooke